Leela Gilday is a Dene-Canadian singer songwriter, born and raised in Yellowknife, Northwest Territories. She has released five solo albums since 2002, two of which have won the Juno Award for Indigenous Music Album of the Year.

Early life
Gilday was born and raised in Yellowknife, Northwest Territories. She is the sister of singer-songwriter Jay Gilday.

Gilday earned a Bachelor of Music degree from the University of Alberta in 1997.
She received an Alumni Horizon Award in 2004 and a Fleck Fellowship at the Banff Centre for the Arts in 2008.

Career
Gilday has released five solo albums to date. In 2002, she was awarded Best Female Artist, Best Folk Album, and Best Songwriter at the Canadian Indigenous Music Awards for her first release, Spirit World, Solid Wood. She was also named in Maclean'''s Top 50 Under 30 that same year. In 2003, she was nominated at the Juno Awards for Best Music of Aboriginal Canada.

Her second album, Sedzé, was released in 2006, and won Aboriginal Recording of the Year at the 2007 Juno Awards. Up Here named Gilday Northerner of the Year in 2007.

Her third album, Calling All Warriors, was released in 2010. It won Aboriginal Recording of the Year at the Western Canadian Music Awards. In 2011, Gilday won Aboriginal Female Entertainer of the Year at the Aboriginal People's Choice Music Awards.
Her fourth record, Heart of the People, was released in 2014 and garnered a Western Canadian Music Award for Indigenous Recording of the Year, as well as a nomination for Aboriginal Album of the Year at the 2015 Juno Awards.

In 2019, Gilday had an acting role in the drama film Red Snow.

Her fifth record, North Star Calling, was released in 2019. In February 2020, Gilday was one of the inaugural recipients (alongside Haviah Mighty) of the SOCAN "Her" Music Award, a national prize recognizing outstanding achievement among female and female-presenting musicians. She won the Canadian Folk Music Award for Indigenous Songwriter of the Year at the 16th Canadian Folk Music Awards in 2021 for North Star Calling. The album won the 2021 Juno Award for Indigenous Artist or Group of the Year.

In 2023, she participated in an all-star recording of Serena Ryder's song "What I Wouldn't Do", which was released as a charity single to benefit Kids Help Phone's Feel Out Loud campaign for youth mental health. The recording also interpolated parts of Gilday's song "North Star Calling".

Discography
 Spirit World, Solid Wood (2002)
 Sedzé (2006)
 Calling All Warriors (2010)
 Heart of the People (2014)
 North Star Calling'' (2019)

References

External links
 

Living people
21st-century Canadian women singers
21st-century First Nations people
Canadian women singer-songwriters
Canadian folk singer-songwriters
Dene people
First Nations musicians
Juno Award for Indigenous Music Album of the Year winners
Musicians from Yellowknife
University of Alberta alumni
Year of birth missing (living people)
Canadian Folk Music Award winners
First Nations women